Hansen Mountains is a large group of nunataks rising to about  above the Antarctic plateau. The Hansen Mountains were first mapped by Norwegian cartographers from air photos taken by the 1936–1937 Lars Christensen Expedition. They were named for H.E. Hansen, the Norwegian cartographer who compiled the maps for this and other Norwegian Antarctic expeditions. 

Their northernmost peak is called Fram Peak, named "Framfjellet" (the forward peak) by the personnel of the Lars Christensen Expedition.

See also
Billingane Peaks, located east-southeast of See Nunatak at the eastern end of the Hansen Mountains
Galtefjellet, southeastern of two rock outliers on the south side of Purka Mountain in the Hansen Mountains
Melfjellet, rock outcrop in the eastern part of the Hansen Mountains

References

External links

Nunataks of Kemp Land